Karl Zerbe (September 16, 1903 – November 24, 1972) was a German-born American painter and educator.

Biography

Karl Zerbe was born on September 16, 1903 in Berlin, Germany. The family lived in Paris, France from 1904–1914, where his father was an executive in an electrical supply concern. In 1914 they moved to Frankfurt, Germany where they lived until 1920. Karl Zerbe studied chemistry in 1920 at the Technische Hochschule in Friedberg, Germany.

From 1921 until 1923 he lived in Munich, where he studied painting at the Debschitz School, mainly under Josef Eberz. From 1924 until 1926 Karl Zerbe worked and traveled in Italy on a fellowship from the City of Munich. In 1932 his oil painting titled, ‘’Herbstgarten’’ (autumnal garden), of 1929, was acquired by the National-Galerie, Berlin; in 1937, the painting was destroyed by the Nazis as "Degenerate art."

From 1937 until 1955, Karl Zerbe was the head of the Department of Painting, School of the Museum of Fine Arts, Boston.

In 1939 Karl Zerbe became a U.S. citizen and the same year for the first time he used encaustic. He joined the faculty in the Department of Art and Art History at Florida State University in 1955, where he taught until his death.

He was grouped together with the Boston artists Kahlil Gibran (sculptor), Jack Levine and Hyman Bloom as a key member of the Boston Expressionist school of painting, and through his teaching influenced a generation of painters, including, among others, David Aronson, Bernard Chaet, Reed Kay, Arthur Polonsky, Jack Kramer, Barbara Swan, Andrew Kooistra, and Lois Tarlow.

His works are thought significant because they record "the response of a distinguished artist of basically European sensibility to the physical and cultural scene of the New World".

Solo exhibitions
1922: Gurlitt Gallery, Berlin, Germany
1926: Georg Caspari Gallery, Munich, Germany; Kunsthalle, Bremen, Germany; Osthaus Museum, Hagen, Germany
1934: Germanic Museum (now Busch-Reisinger Museum), Harvard University, Cambridge, Massachusetts
1934, 1935, 1936, 1937: Marie Sterner Galleries, New York City
1936, 1938, 1939, 1940: Grace Horne Galleries, Boston, Massachusetts
1941: Vose Galleries, Boston; Buchholz Gallery, New York City
1943: Mount Holyoke College, South Hadley, Massachusetts
1943, 1946, 1948, 1951, 1952: The Downtown Gallery, New York City
1943, 1947: Berkshire Museum, Pittsfield, Massachusetts
1945, 1946: Art Institute of Chicago, Illinois
1946: Detroit Institute of Arts, Detroit, Michigan
1948, 1949: Philadelphia Art Alliance, Pennsylvania
1948, 1955: Boris Mirski Gallery, Boston, Massachusetts
1950: Munson-Williams-Proctor Arts Institute, Utica, New York
1951-1952: Retrospective Exhibition circulated by the Institute of Contemporary Art, Boston, traveled to: Baltimore Museum of Art; Colorado Springs Fine Arts Center; Currier Gallery of Art, Manchester, New Hampshire; Florida Gulf Coast Art Center, Clearwater; M. H. de Young Memorial Museum, San Francisco; Massachusetts Institute of Technology, Cambridge, Massachusetts;
1954: The Allan Gallery, New York City
1958: Florida State University, Tallahassee; Ringling Brothers Museum of Art, Sarasota, Florida
1958, 1959, 1960: Nordness Gallery, New York City
1960: New Arts Gallery, Atlanta, Georgia
1961-1962: Retrospective Exhibition circulated by The American Federation of Arts, Boston University

Work in public collections

Zerbe's work is in various public collections, including:

See also
Art movement
Art periods
Expressionism

References

Further reading
 Ulrich Thieme; Felix Becker, ed., Allgemeines Lexikon der bildenden Künstler, V 36, Leipzig, 1947, p. 463.
 Frederick S. Wight, Milestones of American Painting in our century, (New York : Chanticleer Press [for the] Institute of Contemporary Art, Boston, 1949.) OCLC 154058045 p. 25, 124, 125.
 Sheldon Cheney, The story of modern art (New York, Viking Press, 1958.) OCLC 685440
 Alan D. Gruskin, Painting in the U.S.A. (Garden City, New York, Doubleday & Co., 1946.) OCLC 1220327 p. 85.
 Philips Collection, The Phillips Collection : a museum of modern art and its sources : catalogue : Washington (New York : Thames and Hudson, 1952.) OCLC 18027945 p. 139, 230.
 Lee Nordness ed., text by Allen Stuart Weller, Art: USA: now (New York, Viking Press, 1963.) OCLC 265650 p. 126-129.
 Edgar Preston Richardson, Painting in America, from 1502 to the present (New York, Crowell, 1965.) OCLC 517571 p. 405. 406.
 Bram Dijkstra, American expressionism: art and social change, 1920-1950, (New York : H.N. Abrams, in association with the Columbus Museum of Art, 2003.) 
 Judith Bookbinder, Boston modern: figurative expressionism as alternative modernism, (Durham, N.H. : University of New Hampshire Press ; Hanover : University Press of New England, ©2005.) 
 Allgemeine Künstler Lexikon Bio-Bibliographische Index, Band 10, page 727
Marika Herskovic, American Abstract and Figurative Expressionism: Style Is Timely Art Is Timeless (New York School Press, 2009.) . p. 248-251
ART USA NOW Ed. by Lee Nordness;Vol.1, (The Viking Press, Inc., 1963.) pp. 126–129
 Elke Lauterbach: Sieben Münchner Maler: Eine Ausstellungsgemeinschaft in der Zeit von 1931–1937. München 1999. (= Schriften aus dem Institut für Kunstgeschichte der Universität München, Bd. 70.)
 Günther Graßmann, Malerei und Graphik. Ausstellung zum 85. Geburtstag. Bayerische Akademie der Schönen Künste, Ausstellung und Katalog in Zusammenarbeit mit Professor Günther Graßmann, Dr. Inge Feuchtmayr, Marie Stelzer, Garching 1985.

External links
Karl Zerbe Paintings in Museums and Public Art Galleries from artcyclopedia.com
Figureworks.com/20th Century work at www.figureworks.com
 Elke Lauterbach: Sieben Münchner Maler: Eine Ausstellungsgemeinschaft in der Zeit von 1931-1937 - Inhaltsverzeichnis und Einleitung 7 Münchner Maler
  (Photographer: John Brook)

1903 births
1972 deaths
20th-century German painters
20th-century American male artists
German male painters
German emigrants to the United States
20th-century American painters
American male painters
Modern painters
Artists from Berlin
Artists from Boston
Federal Art Project artists
School of the Museum of Fine Arts at Tufts faculty
Boston expressionism
Florida State University faculty